Oakridge Acres is a neighbourhood in north-west of the City of London, Ontario, Canada. It is north of Westmount and north-east of Byron. The neighbourhood comprises the subdivisions of Oakridge Acres, Oakridge Park, Oakridge Meadows (also known as Huntington), Thornwood Estates, Hunt Club Green, Hazelden, and Hazelden Park. Almost all of its residents live in low-density, single detached dwellings. As of 2011, the area is home to 16,730 residents.

The neighbourhood is considered a middle to upper-income area, with an average family income of $124,966 an average dwelling value of $319,726 and a home ownership rate of 89%.

History
Oakridge Acres was developed starting on October 12, 1950 by Sifton Properties consisting of 1,649 units spanning 74 acres.  Oakridge Park was added in a second phase in the early 1960s. In 1963 Oakridge's Sifton Bog was donated to the City of London. 

Located within the subdivision of Hazelden is Hazelden Manor (from which the subdivision's name is derived) at 1132 St. Anthony Road. This home was built in 1892 by Colonel John William Little, who would later become mayor of London, and renovated in 1929. Due to the historical significance and preservation of this building, it was designated as a Heritage Property.

Government and politics
Oakridge exists within the federal electoral district of London West. It is currently represented by Arielle Kayabaga of the Liberal Party of Canada, first elected in 2021.

Provincially, the area is within the constituency of London West. It is currently represented by Peggy Sattler of the New Democratic Party, first elected in 2013 and re-elected in 2014, 2018, and 2022.

In London's non-partisan municipal politics, Oakridge lies within ward 8. It is currently represented by Councillor Steve Lehman, first elected in 2018.

Education
There are ten schools located in the neighbourhood from 3 different school boards.

Thames Valley District School Board
 Riverside Public School
 Clara Brenton Public School
 John Dearness Public School
 Westoaks French Immersion Public School
 Oakridge Secondary School

London District Catholic School Board
 St. Paul Catholic School
 Notre Dame Catholic School
 St. Thomas Aquinas Secondary School

Conseil scolaire Viamonde
 Ecole Marie Curie

Private
 Matthews Hall

References

Neighbourhoods in London, Ontario